Óscar Cabedo Cardá (born 12 November 1994 in Onda) is a Spanish cyclist, who currently rides for UCI Continental team . He is the brother of the cyclist Víctor Cabedo who died in 2012. In August 2018, he was named in the startlist for the 2018 Vuelta a España.

Major results

Grand Tour general classification results timeline

References

External links

1994 births
Living people
Spanish male cyclists
People from Plana Baixa
Sportspeople from the Province of Castellón
Cyclists from the Valencian Community
People from Onda